Dalmally railway station is a railway station serving the village of Dalmally, near Loch Awe in Scotland. This station is on the Oban branch of the West Highland Line, originally part of the Callander and Oban Railway. It is sited  from Callander via Glen Ogle, between Tyndrum Lower and Loch Awe. ScotRail manage the station and operate all services.

History 

This station opened on 1 April 1877. For a while, it was the western extremity of the Callander and Oban Railway, until the line finally reached its ultimate destination, Oban, on 1 July 1880. The station building was destroyed by fire on 16 November 1898.

The red sandstone building and signal box are a Category C listed building as being a 'well detailed example of a small through station in the area'.

Facilities 
Facilities at the station are very basic, comprising just benches on both platforms, a help point and a small car park. There is step-free access to the station, but the only access to platform 2 is via a Barrow Crossing. As there are no facilities to purchase tickets, passengers must buy one in advance, or from the guard on the train.

Passenger volume 

The statistics cover twelve month periods that start in April.

Services

On weekdays only, an additional train to Oban operates in the late afternoon. On Sundays, there are three departures each way throughout the year, plus a fourth in the summer months only. The additional service runs to and from Edinburgh Waverley, rather than Glasgow.

References

Bibliography

External links 

 Video footage of the station on YouTube

Railway stations in Argyll and Bute
Former Caledonian Railway stations
Railway stations in Great Britain opened in 1877
Railway stations served by ScotRail
Listed railway stations in Scotland
Category C listed buildings in Argyll and Bute